Perivol Rock (‘Skala Perivol’ \ska-'la pe-ri-'vol\) is the rock off Snow Island in the South Shetland Islands, Antarctica, extending 230 m in a southeast–northwest direction and 170 m wide.

The feature is named after the settlement of Perivol in western Bulgaria.

Location
Perivol Rock is located 750 m northwest of Cape Timblón and 1.28 km north-northeast of Mezdra Point. British mapping in 1968, and Bulgarian mapping in 2005 and 2009.

See also
 List of Antarctic and sub-Antarctic islands
 South Shetland Islands

Maps
 L.L. Ivanov. Antarctica: Livingston Island and Greenwich, Robert, Snow and Smith Islands. Scale 1:120000 topographic map.  Troyan: Manfred Wörner Foundation, 2009.   (Updated second edition 2010.  )
Antarctic Digital Database (ADD). Scale 1:250000 topographic map of Antarctica. Scientific Committee on Antarctic Research (SCAR). Since 1993, regularly upgraded and updated.

References
 Perivol Rock. SCAR Composite Antarctic Gazetteer.
 Bulgarian Antarctic Gazetteer. Antarctic Place-names Commission. (details in Bulgarian, basic data in English)

External links
 Perivol Rock. Copernix satellite image

Islands of the South Shetland Islands
Bulgaria and the Antarctic